Avgustina-Kalina Plamen Petkova (born 19 November 1991) is a Bulgarian actress.

Life and career
Petkova was born on 19 November 1991 in Pleven. In 2014, she graduated from the National Academy for Theatre and Film Arts with a degree in drama theatre.

She has performed on the stages of the Azaryan Theater, Stefan Kirov Drama Theatre in Sliven, Konstantin Velichkov Drama and Puppet Theater in Pazardzhik, the Sfumato Theatre and the Nikolai Binev Youth Theater.

Petkova is involved in the Bulgarian dubbing of films and series. Her voice roles including Penguins of Madagascar, Peter Rabbit, Spider-Man: Into the Spider-Verse, Ralph Breaks the Internet, Tom & Jerry, Raya and the Last Dragon, Sing 2, Turning Red, The Bad Guys and others.

Filmography

Live-action

Voice acting

Films

References 

1991 births
Living people
Actresses from Sofia
21st-century Bulgarian actresses
Bulgarian stage actresses
Bulgarian television actresses
Bulgarian voice actresses